= Tsoi Ka Wai =

Hong Kong table tennis player

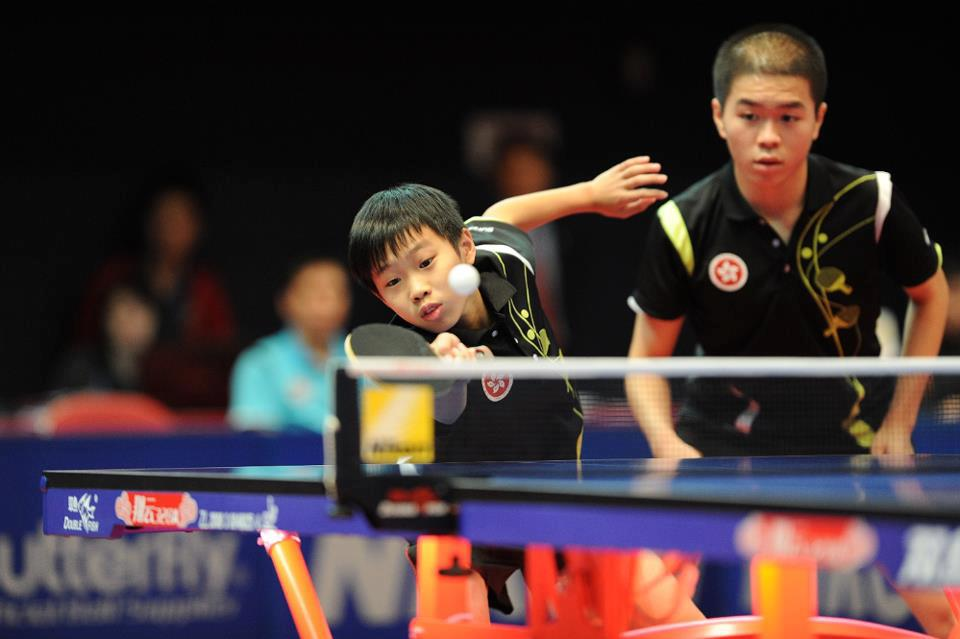
- Tsoi Ka Wai (right) in 2012

Personal information
- Full name: Tsoi Ka Wai, Edmond
- Nationality: Chinese (Hong Kong)
- Born: 30 April 1997 (age 29) Hong Kong
- Height: 5 ft 8.5 in (1.74 m)

Sport
- Sport: Table tennis
- Playing style: Shakehand

Tsoi Ka Wai (蔡家瑋; born 30 April 1997) is a Hong Kong table tennis athlete who competed in the 2012 International Table Tennis Federation Mexico Junior & Cadet Open.

Along with Hung Ka Tak (Hong Kong Youth Olympian), Tsoi won the title of World Championship and Team World 1st runner-up. He also competed in 2010, 2011 and 2012 ITTF Nikon Hong Kong Junior and Cadet Open. He was a bronze medalist in men's doubles at the Hong Kong Cadet Open in the U15 age group.

== 2012 ITTF Mexico World Cadet Open ==
At age 15, Tsoi won his first world title by winning the 2012 ITTF World Cadet Open held in Mexico with Hung Ka Tak.

Tsoi and Hung were the silver medalists for Team event, in which they first beat Brazil Team B (3-0) and Brazil Team A (3-1), but lost to Argentina Team A in the finals (2-3).
